Guillaume Courtet, OP (1589–1637) was a French Dominican priest who has been described as the first Frenchman to have visited Japan. He was martyred in 1637 and canonized in 1987.

Career
Courtet was born in Sérignan, near Béziers, in 1589 or 1590. He entered the orders in the city of Béziers and later entered the Capucines in Toulouse.

Courtet was active in the diplomatic field during the Thirty Years' War and was remarked by the French statesman Richelieu.

In 1636, Guillaume Courtet entered Japan in secret, with the objective of furthering Western efforts to promote Christianity there. He was accompanied by a Spanish friend named Miguel de Ozaraza.

Entering Japan was a very dangerous endeavour, as Christianity had been prohibited in the country since 1613. Courtet entered the country under the Spanish name Tomaso de Santo Domingo. He sailed from the Philippines and disembarked in Ishigaki-jima, but a few days later he was caught and imprisoned for one year. From there he was brought to Kagoshima and then Nagasaki.

In an attempt to make him apostatize, he was tortured by being submitted to the "torture of the water", the "torture of the alênes" (needles under the fingernails) and the hanging torture of tsurushi. He remained true to his faith, however, and as a result he was beheaded with his friends on 29 September 1637.

Cause of beatification and cannonization
The Positio Super Introductione Causae or the cause of beatification was authored by respected historian, Fidel Villarroel, which led to his beatification during Pope John Paul II's papal visit to the Philippines. It was the first beatification ceremony to be held outside the Vatican in history.

Guillaume Courtet became a saint on 18 October 1987 among the 16 Martyrs of Japan.

See also
 France-Japan relations

Notes

References
 Polak, Christian. (2001). Soie et lumières: L'âge d'or des échanges franco-japonais (des origines aux années 1950). Tokyo: Chambre de Commerce et d'Industrie Française du Japon, Hachette Fujin Gahōsha (アシェット婦人画報社).
 __. (2002). 絹と光: 知られざる日仏交流100年の歴史 (江戶時代-1950年代) Kinu to hikariō: shirarezaru Nichi-Futsu kōryū 100-nen no rekishi (Edo jidai-1950-nendai). Tokyo: Ashetto Fujin Gahōsha, 2002. ;

External links
 Association of the friends of Guillaume Courtet (French)
 Association of the friends of Guillaume Courtet (English)

French Dominicans
1589 births
1637 deaths
French Roman Catholic missionaries
Beatifications by Pope John Paul II
Canonizations by Pope John Paul II
Roman Catholic missionaries in Japan
Dominican missionaries
French expatriates in Japan
French torture victims
French people executed abroad
17th-century Christian saints
17th-century executions by Japan
17th-century Roman Catholic martyrs
17th-century travelers